Mother Court may refer to:

 United States District Court for the Southern District of New York, nickname
 The Mother Court, a book about the S.D.N.Y. court